The fixture between Ferencvárosi TC and MTK Budapest is a local derby in Budapest, Hungary and a fierce rivalry.

History
The first match between Ferencváros and MTK was played in the 1903 Nemzeti Bajnokság I season on 1 March 1903 at Millenáris Sporttelep. The match was won by Ferencváros (3-1).

Until 1931, the fixture between the Ferencváros and MTK Budapest was called by the English word "derby". However, from 1931 the term Örökrangadó was used which was coined by Gyula Bendekovics, a barber assistant, in a contest organised by a sports paper.

In the 2017–18 Nemzeti Bajnokság I season the two clubs did not play any matches since MTK were relegated.

In the 2018–19 Nemzeti Bajnokság I the two clubs met for the first time on 29 July 2018 and the match was won by Ferencváros 1–4.

All time league results

Statistics

Statistics

Players who played for both clubs

From Ferencváros to MTK
  Bence Batik
  Barnabás Bese
  Norbert Csiki
  Lajos Hegedűs
  Gábor Pölöskei
  Alfréd Schaffer
  Imre Schlosser
  Krisztián Timár
  Dragan Vukmir
  Ferenc Weisz
  Rafe Wolfe
  Gábor Zavadszky

From MTK to Ferencváros
  Attila Busai
  Ákos Buzsáky
  Ádám Pintér
  Roland Varga

See also
 Derby of Budapest
 Ferencvárosi TC
 MTK Budapest FC

References

Football derbies in Hungary
Ferencvárosi TC
MTK Budapest FC
Sport in Budapest
Nicknamed sporting events